Emojli was a social application for iOS and Android, created by YouTuber and web developer Tom Scott, and YouTuber and broadcast engineer Matt Gray. Usernames could contain only emoji and users could only communicate using emoji within the app.

History 
Tom Scott and Matt Gray were inspired to create the app after seeing the success of Yo and the release of new emoji characters by the Unicode Consortium. During a talk at Electromagnetic Field Festival, the developers commented that the app originated largely as a joke, but that by the time of launch 70,000 unique usernames had been reserved. The app was launched on 29 August 2014. After press coverage the developers began receiving offers for venture capital.

Due to the cost and effort of maintaining the application, the developers closed the app on 30 July 2015.

Development 
The back end of the app was coded by Tom Scott in PHP and MySQL and the front end was designed and programmed by Matt Gray in HTML, CSS and JavaScript.

The pair remarked that they ran into problems as not all web browsers supported emoji, and mobile operating system support for them varied. All work on the app was done in their spare time and took a little over a month.

The iOS version of the app was released on 29 August 2014. The Android version was released on 30 January 2015.

The app shut down on 30 July 2015.

References

External links 
The end of Emojli

IOS software
Computer-related introductions in 2014
Emoji
Defunct social networking services